Einar Hermann (10 August 1878 – 7 September 1953) was a Danish gymnast. He competed in the men's team event at the 1908 Summer Olympics.

References

1878 births
1953 deaths
Danish male artistic gymnasts
Olympic gymnasts of Denmark
Gymnasts at the 1908 Summer Olympics
Sportspeople from Copenhagen